Rotating bolt is a method of locking the  breech (or rear barrel) of a firearm closed for firing. Johann Nicolaus von Dreyse developed the first rotating bolt firearm, the "Dreyse needle gun", in 1836. The Dreyse locked using the bolt handle rather than lugs on the bolt head like the Mauser M 98 or M16. The first rotating bolt rifle with two lugs on the bolt head was the Lebel Model 1886 rifle. The concept has been implemented on most firearms chambered for high powered cartridges since the 20th century.

Design
Ferdinand Ritter von Mannlicher, who had earlier developed a non-rotating bolt straight-pull rifle, developed the Steyr-Mannlicher M1895, a straight-pull rifle with a rotating bolt, which was issued to the Austro-Hungarian Army. Mannlicher then developed the M1893 auto rifle which had a screw delayed bolt and later the Mannlicher M1900 operated by a gas piston. This was an inspiration for later gas operated, semi-automatic and selective fire firearms (such as the M1, M14, M16, the L85A1/A2 and the AK-47/74) in which the bolt, upon contact with the breech, rotates and locks into place, the lugs on the bolt locking into the breech or barrel extension.

Upon closing, the bolt goes forward into barrel extension or locking recesses in the receiver, and then rotates; at this point it is locked in place. The bolt remains locked until the action is cycled, either manually by the operator, or mechanically by delayed blowback,  recoil operation, or gas operation which then rotates the bolt and unlocks it from the breech so that it can be withdrawn in order to extract and eject the spent casing, and the next round can be chambered. In gas operation, the gas port, which meters a portion of the combustion gases into the action in order to cycle the weapon, is typically located either midway down the barrel or near the muzzle of the weapon. In this way it functions as a delay, ensuring that the bolt remains locked until chamber pressure has subsided to a safe level.

Rotating bolts are found in delayed blowback, gas-operated, recoil-operated, bolt action, lever-action, and pump-action weapon designs. Another form of delayed blowback which the bolt head rotates as the firing pin strikes locking the chamber until the gas pressure reaches a safe level to extract. As the firing pin retracts, the bolt head turns anti-clockwise unlocking the breech.

Examples
 M1 Garand, gas-operated semi-automatic rifle
 M25 Sniper Weapon System, semi-automatic rifle, gas operated, air cooled
 Lebel Model 1886 rifle, bolt-action rifle
 Steyr-Mannlicher M1895, a straight-pull rifle
 M16, a gas-operated  rifle
 AK-47, a gas-operated rifle
Oerlikon KBA 25mm, gas-operated autocannon
 Imbel IA2, a gas-operated assault rifle
 IWI Tavor TAR-21, a gas-operated assault rifle
 Ruger Mini-14, a gas-operated semi-automatic rifle
 IMI Desert Eagle, one of the few handguns with such mechanism.
 Remington Model 8, a recoil-operated rifle
 Chauchat, a recoil-operated light machine gun
 Remington Model 7600, a pump-action rifle
 The Winchester model 1200, 1300,and Super-X (SXP) Pump Shotguns
 SIG-Sauer MPX, a gas-operated submachine gun
 CMMG Mk 45 Guard, the first AR15 derivative to use radial delayed blowback operation.
 Browning BLR, a lever action rifle with a rotating bolt
 L85A2, A variant of the L85A1

See also 
 Roller locked

External links
Computer Animation demonstrating rotating bolt in the M16
Primer actuated M16 using rotating bolt

Firearm components
Firearm actions